"Young and in Love" is a song written by Dick St. John and performed by Dick and Dee Dee.  It reached #6 on the adult contemporary chart and #17 on the Billboard chart in 1963.  The song was also released in the United Kingdom as a single, but it did not chart.  The song was featured on their 1963 album, Young and in Love.

The song was produced by Don Ralke and The Wilder Brothers.

References

1963 songs
1963 singles
Dick and Dee Dee songs
Warner Records singles